Rinorea thomasii is a species of plant in the Violaceae family. It is endemic to Cameroon.  Its natural habitat is subtropical or tropical moist lowland forests. It is threatened by habitat loss.

References

Endemic flora of Cameroon
thomasii
Vulnerable plants
Taxonomy articles created by Polbot